Chapter 7 may refer to:

Albums
Chapter Seven (album), a 2013 album by Damien Leith. 
Chapter VII, a 1973 album by drummer Buddy Miles

Television
Chapter 7 (American Horror Story), 2016 episode of American Horror Story
Chapter 7 (House of Cards), 2013 episode of House of Cards
 "Chapter 7: The Reckoning", an episode of the first season of The Mandalorian

Other uses
Chapter 7, Title 11, United States Code (Bankruptcy Code)
Chapter VII of the United Nations Charter, the chapter that sets out the UN Security Council's powers to maintain peace